Curse of the Crystal Coconut is the sixth studio album by Scottish heavy metal band Alestorm. It was released on 29 May 2020 via Napalm Records. The album was recorded at Krabi Road, Thailand with the band's long-time producer Lasse Lammert. It was preceded by four singles: "Treasure Chest Party Quest", "Tortuga", "Fannybaws" and "Pirate Metal Drinking Crew".

Background and recording
The album was recorded at Krabi Road, Thailand with producer Lasse Lammert in January 2020. The album was mixed and mastered in the LSD Studios in Lübeck, Germany in February 2020. The music videos for the singles were filmed alongside the album in Thailand back in January. The band had seventeen shows in the summer that had to be cancelled due to the COVID-19 pandemic.

Speaking with Metal Injection about the lyrics in the album, lead vocalist Christopher Bowes stated:

Composition
Like previous Alestorm albums, Curse of the Crystal Coconut has been described as pirate metal, power metal, folk metal, heavy metal, and hard rock. In a review of the album, Exclaim! considered "Treasure Chest Party Quest," "Fannybaws" and "Pirate's Scorn" "[to have] some of the hookiest choruses in the band's catalogue." While describing the song "Treasure Chest Party Quest," Outburn stated, "the fact that the song emerges from behind a veil of 80s cock rock with the usual folk metal adjunct and a bellowing metalcore vocal staccato is an indication from the off that Alestorm is flirting with reinvention and doing it as absurdly as imaginable." Outburn also described the song “Wooden Leg Part 2 (The Woodening)” as "an eight minute, multi-faceted take on prog metal storytelling accented by mournful thrash, symphonic blackness à la Bal-Sagoth and even smidges of death metal. They even described “Call of the Waves” as 'the band's most serious moment of its career." Metal Injection notes thrash-like riffs on the songs "Chomp Chomp" and "Zombies Ate My Pirate Ship". The song "Tortuga" has been described as pop, nu metal, and rap metal because of the rap verse by Captain Yarrface. The song "Pirate's Scorn" is a version of a song that appeared in the Donkey Kong Country animated series, from the episode "Booty and the Beast".

Release
On 8 January 2020, the band announced the title of their sixth studio album, "Curse of the Crystal Coconut," to be released in the summer of 2020. The band later announced that the album would be released on 29 May 2020. On 2 April 2020, the band released the first single from the album titled, "Treasure Chest Party Quest", along with a music video. On 23 April 2020, the band released the second single from the album titled, "Tortuga" featuring Captain Yarrface, along with a music video. On 30 April 2020, the band released an EP titled, "The Treasure Chest EP". The EP features two songs that are on this album and three live versions of songs from their previous albums. On 14 May 2020, the band released the third single from the album titled, "Fannybaws", along with a music video. On 29 May 2020, the band released the fourth single from the album titled, "Pirate Metal Drinking Crew", along with a music video. The band also did a giveaway for people who preordered the album. With the giveaway, the winner would get an Alestorm-branded Nintendo 64 along with a copy of Donkey Kong 64. On 6 July 2020, the band released an animated music video for the song, "Shit Boat (No Fans)". The video was animated by people at 
RMIT University in  Melbourne. A deluxe version of the album includes the normal track listing, along with what is referred to as "16th Century Version" editions of each track was released. On 6 August, The Wooden Box was released and it included two bonus tracks on a 7" Single which are "Big Ship Little Ship" and "Bassline Junkie". The song "Big Ship Little Ship" got a music video. On 31 January 2022, the band released a music video for the song "Zombies Ate My Pirate Ship".

Reception

Curse of the Crystal Coconut received generally positive reviews from critics. Jason Roche of Blabbermouth.net called the album "another indicator that the secret behind the band's longevity is their stellar knack for never letting the overall themes drown out the catchiness of their song-craft." In a positive review, Alan Faulkner of Distorted Sound stated, "the lyrics may be silly and some of the songs are a bit out there, but that is what Alestorm are about – having fun and enjoying the music."

Manus Hopkins of Exclaim! gave the album a positive review stating,  "it's incredible that Alestorm haven't run out of pirate riffs and lyrics about drinking, pillaging and sailing the seas, but this record is packed with all those and even more." Holly Wrigh of Metal Hammer called the album "another gem in the Scots’ steadily improving repertoire of jolly, foul-mouthed metal shanties that go far beyond the confines of gimmickry."

Max Morin, writing for Metal Injection, was also positive, calling "[the album] another killer addition to a packed roster and is dying to be played lived." Mike Elfers of Punknews called the album "eleven tracks of their signature pirate metal" and recommended it to "anyone that likes drinking and/or fun."

Metal Storm called the album an improvement "on the uneven songwriting that made No Grave But the Sea a modest disappointment..." Nick Balazs of Brave Words praised the album calling it "more consistent than past efforts." He also stated that since the band has "continued to embrace their silliness, it has resulted in stronger song development and even short tracks, like the foul-mouthed, but musically elegant 1-minute “Shit Boat (No Fans)” and the under 3-minute, accordion led, “Pirate’s Scorn” retain credibility and better yet, flow brilliantly within the context of the album."

Deadpress and Ghost Cult Magazine were less positive. Carlos Zelaya of Deadpress described the album "[as] one of many examples of hollow, empty vessels having the most loudest, unbearable resonations." Gary Alcock of Ghost Cult Magazine was slightly more positive stating, "...Curse of the Crystal Coconut does feature some gloriously stupid moments and a few seriously catchy hooks, but like the Indiana Jones movie with a similar title, the lack of ideas apparent on certain tracks suggests the joke might finally [be] wearing thin, even with the band themselves."

Track listing

Notes
 All production, mixing, and mastering by Lasse Lammert.
 Track listing and credits from the CD Booklet.
 "Pirate's Scorn" is a cover of a song from the Donkey Kong Country animated series.
 "Henry Martin" is the band's cover of a traditional Scottish folk song of the same name.

Deluxe version
The deluxe version of the album includes the normal track listing, along with what is referred to as "16th Century Version" editions of each track afterwards. These are 8-bit styled recreations of the tracks with bitcrushed vocals.

Wooden box set
The wooden box set included two bonus tracks on a 7" single, which are "Big Ship Little Ship" and "Bassline Junkie". Singer Christopher Bowes said on a livestream listening party on Napalm Records' YouTube channel that these two songs along with other bonus tracks from past Alestorm albums would be released on Spotify some point in the future.

Personnel
Credits for Curse of the Crystal Coconut

Alestorm
 Christopher Bowes – lead vocals, keytar
 Máté Bodor – guitars
 Gareth Murdock – bass
 Elliot Vernon – keyboards, unclean vocals
 Peter Alcorn – drums

Additional
 Captain Yarrface – rap vocals on "Tortuga"
 Mathias "Vreth" Lillmåns – unclean vocals on "Chomp Chomp"
 Fernando Rey – vocals on "Wooden Leg Pt. 2 (The Woodening)"
 Kaelhakase & Tatsuguchi – vocals on "Wooden Leg Pt. 2 (The Woodening)"
 Ally Storch – violins
 Patty Gurdy – vocals on "Zombies Ate My Pirate Ship" and hurdy gurdy on "Chomp Chomp", "Zombies Ate My Pirate Ship", "Call of the Waves", "Henry Martin", and "Big Ship Little Ship" 
 Tobias Hain – trumpet, flugelhorn
 Jan Philipp Jacobs – trombone
 Phil Philp & Emma Phillips – backing vocals
 Joe Carter-Hawkins – backing vocals on "Tortuga"
 Matthew Bell – synthesizer on "Tortuga"
 Ben Turk – additional synthesizers & vocal tuning on "Tortuga"

Production
 Lasse Lammert – production, mixing, mastering
 Dan Goldsworthy – artwork

Charts

References

Alestorm albums
Donkey Kong
Napalm Records albums
2020 albums